Helen Kathleen Courtney (5 June 1952 – 4 March 2020) was a New Zealand cartoonist and illustrator, known for her work on Broadsheet.

Life 
Of Ngāti Toa Rangatira, Ngāti Raukawa ki te Tonga and Te Āti Awa descent, Courtney grew up in West Auckland.

Career 
Courtney joined the Broadsheet collective in 1974, contributing cartoons and illustrations and designing the magazine between 1990 and 1991. She published in a number of New Zealand publications including, Craccum (1983) and Tu Mai (1984).

Chess

Helen Courtney represented New Zealand three times in the Women's Chess Olympiad.

Publications 

 Harpies & heroines : a cartoon history of women's changing roles (featured, 2003)
 Broadsheet (designer, 1990-1991)
 No body's perfect: a self-help book for women who have problems with food (illustrator, 1989)

Exhibitions 

 Killer Queen: Cartoons by Helen Courtney (2015), Charlotte Museum, Auckland
 Harpies & Heroines (2003), National Library of New Zealand

References 

New Zealand illustrators
New Zealand cartoonists
New Zealand women cartoonists
2020 deaths
1952 births
New Zealand comics artists
New Zealand female comics artists
New Zealand women illustrators
Ngāti Toa people
Ngāti Raukawa people
Te Āti Awa people
New Zealand Māori artists